The 3rd Marine Infantry Regiment is a unit of the French Army in the French Forces. The 3e RIMa is one of the oldest of the troupes de marine. This regiment is one of the "Quatre Grands" of marine infantry once garrisoned within the four military ports, ready to embark : the « Grand Un », the « Grand Deux », the « Grand Trois » and the « Grand Quatre ». The « Grand Trois » has participated actively to the various far expeditions of the 19th century in Africa, the Americas, Oceania and the Orient. Surnamed also the "3rd Marine", the unit was part of the « Blue Division » which illustrated capability at the Battle of Bazeilles on August 31 and September 1, 1870. The regiment was subordinated to the 9th Marine Infantry Brigade.

Creation and different nominations 

 1854 : the 3rd Marine Infantry Regiment was stationed at Rochefort.
 1869 : the 3rd Marine Infantry Regiment was spread between Rochefort, Cochinchine, Réunion, New Caledonia and Tahiti.
 1870 : the 3rd Marching Marine Infantry Regiment.
 1890 : the 3rd Marine Infantry Regiment was doubled and formed the 7th Colonial Infantry Regiment.
 1900 : the 3rd Marine Infantry Regiment was designated 3rd Colonial Infantry Regiment.
 1914 : the 3rd Colonial Infantry Regiment was garrisoned at Rochefort. The regiment was part of the 3rd Colonial Brigade; 3rd Colonial Infantry Division 3e DIC.
 1946 : 3rd Colonial Infantry Battalion 3e BIC. 
 1958 : Instruction Center of the 3e RIC.
 1958 : Instruction Center of the 3e RIMa.
 1963 : 3rd Marine Infantry Regiment 3e RIMa.

History

Ancien Regime

Wars of the Revolution & Empire 

 1813 : German Campaign of 1813
 October 16–19 : Battle of Leipzig
 1814 : Campaign of France
 February 14, 1814 : Battle of Vauchamps

1815 to 1848 

Foundation was merged with those of the marine infantry whom were at the source of the Compagnie Ordinaire de la Mer created by Richelieu in 1622. A Royal Ordinance of King Louis Philippe I, the King of the French reconstituted in 1831 two regiments of marine infantry from the 45th, the 51st Line Infantry Regiment and 16th Light Infantry Regiment which was garrisoned at the time in the colonies; a new decree ordinance dated November 20, 1838 created a third regiment of arms. Each regiment counted 30 active companies, out of which 4 grenadier, 4 de voltigeurs and 22 du centre, a headquarter staff and a company hors rang. The 1st regiment garrisoned at Brest, Cherbourg and Guadeloupe, the 2nd regiment at Brest, Rochefort and Martinique; the 3rd at Toulon, Cayenne, Senegal and the Bourbon island (current Reunion island).
 Accordingly, the origin of the 3e RIMa dates back to 1831. With the actual 2nd Marine Infantry Regiment 2e RIMa, the regiment is the oldest of the "quatre vieux". The regiment garrisoned in Rochefort from 1838 to 1946.
 Campaign in Senegal from 1833 to 1835. 
 Plata expedition in 1840.
 Operations of Oceania from 1843 to 1846.
 First expeditions in Morocco in 1844.
 Second Plata expedition in 1850.

Second Empire 

Napoleon III expressed a plentiful of solicitude for the troupes coloniales; a decree of 1854 reorganised the marine infantry by creating four regiments each associated with its home port. 
 Crimean War and during the expedition of the Baltic (1854).
 Campaign of China (1855–1860).
 Campaign of Senegal (1863).
 Campaign of Annam, Cochinchine and Cambodia (1858–1868).
 1869 : dispersed between Rochefort, Cochinchine, the Reunion, New Caledonia and Tahiti.
 For a first time, the 3rd Marine engaged in combat on metropolitan soil. On August 31 and September 1, 1870, engaged at the corps of the Blue Division, the 3e RIMa disappeared at Bazeilles during a combat until the "dernière cartouche".

On August 17, 1870, the 3rd Marching Marine Infantry Regiment was part of the Armée de Châlons (1870) of Marshal de MacMahon.

 With the 2nd Marching Marine Infantry Regiment of colonel Alleyron, the 3e under the orders of the colonel Lecamus, formed the 2nd Brigade at the orders of général Charles Martin des Pallières. This 2nd Brigade with the 1st Brigade of général Reboul, three batteries de 4, two batteries de 4 and one machine gun battery of the marine artillery regiment, one engineer company, constituted the 3rd Infantry Division commanded by division général De Vassoigne. This infantry division evolved at the corps of the 12th Army Corps, commanded by division general Lebrun.
– August 23 to 26 1870 – March towards the east.
– August 31, 1870 – Battle of Bazeilles.

1870 to 1914 

 New Caledonia (1878)
 Indochina (1822–1885)
 Africa (1882–1894)
 Formose (1884)
 Nouvelles-Hébrides (1886)
 Diégo-Suarez (1898)
 Crete (1898)
 China (1900)
 Morocco (1911–1913)

World War I

Division attachment 
 From August 1914 to February 1916 : 3rd Colonial Infantry Division, 3e DIC
 From February 1916 to November 1918 : 17th Colonial Infantry Division (France), 17e DIC 
 The regiment illustrated capability during the war, at the Battle of Rossignol, la Marne, and at Beauséjour prior to being engaged on the Orient front until June 1919.

1914 

 Operations of the IIIrd and IVth armies. 
 Battle of the Frontiers
 August 22 : Battle of Rossignol 
 August 24 : Saint-Vincent
 August 26 to 29 : combats in the sector of Luzy-Saint-Martin – Cesse with the 21st Colonial Artillery Regiment 21e RAC
 September 6–7 : First Battle of the Marne : Écriennes, Vauclerc

1915 

 February 16–23 : Champagne : fortin de Beauséjour
 May 15 : Ville-sur-Tourbe
 September 25 : battle of Champagne: Main-de-Massiges, Côte 191, Bois de l'Oreille.

1916 
 February 26 around 1500 : more than half of the regiment (5 companies) were lost at sea while in transit to Thessaloniki, to join the 17th Colonial Infantry Division (France).

1917 
French Army of the Orient
 April to May : Battle of the Crna Bend (1917)

1918 
 Serbia: Sokol, Dropolje, Kravtiza, battles during which the regiment was cited at the orders of the armed forces. During these five years of war, the 3e endured the loss of 4750 men. 
 September 15 to 18 : Vetrenik
 September 23 to 24 : Gradsko 
 The regiment endured the loss of 4617 men morts au champ d'honneur.

Interwar period 

 In 1925, the 3e RIC was engaged in Morocco.
 1919 – 1939 : garrisoned at Rochefort.

World War II

Phoney War 
The 3rd Infantry Colonial Regiment 3e RIC was one of the three infantry regiments of the 1st Colonial Infantry Division. This division was placed in reserve of the IInd Army which was the first in line to protect the Maginot Line in a turning manoeuvre.

Battle of France 
 Combats in the region of Bouzanville and Beaumont-en-Argonne. At the corps of 21st corps, movement towards the north of meuse to intercept. Accordingly, the 3e was found engaged in combat for a third time in the same region. Following, the 3e protected the unfolding of the 1re DIC on Saulx. During these engagements, the 3e endured the loss of 500 men. The 3e RIC was cited at the orders of the armed forces. 
 1940 : the 3e RIC was dissolved. 
 1944 : battalion formed from Maquis of the south-west which gave formation to the 3e RIC. Action in dordogne. Occupation of Bergerac and entry into Bordeaux. These units participated to the operations in North Africa.

1945 to present 

 From 1955 to 1957 : the regiment participated, under the form of a marching battalion, to operations in Tunisia, Morocco and Algeria. 
 Absorbed by other colonial regiments, the battalion's regiments would not bear the insignia of the 3rd Marine. On December 31, 1957, the 3e RIC was transformed into the center of instruction of the 3e RIC which became that of the 3e RIMa, on December 1, 1958. 
 On March 1, 1963 : the regiment was reconstituted at Vannes by merger with the Régiment d'infanterie-chars de marine and the 9th Marine Infantry Brigade. 
 Passed under the "motorized" type since 1969, the regiment was the first to be completely professionalized. With the DEVOM (Volunteer Detachment for Outre-Mer) destined to assume, during fifteen month, the relief of the 2nd Foreign Parachute Regiment 2e REP in Tchad. The 3rd Marine Infantry Regiment was accordingly able to participate to all major exterior theatres of operations. 
 The first regiment to be professionalized in 1973. 
 From 1978 to 1980 : Opération Tacaud in Tchad. During this operation, the 3e RIMa endured the loss of four with twelve wounded. The regiment was accordingly cited at the orders of the armed forces. 
 The 3e RIMa was engaged part of the Multinational Force in Lebanon and partook also in peacekeeping missions part of the United Nations Interim Force in Lebanon. 
 1991 : the regiment participated in the Gulf War as a unit of Division Daguet. The regiment was cited at the orders of the armed forces. 
 1995 : the 3e RIMa illustrated capability at the Battle of Vrbanja Bridge. Actions led by the regiment allowed the blue helmets of the FORPRONU to exit from a passive position due to a first time engagement in hostile responses. Two casualties resulted from this event with seventeen others wounded. 
 2002 : the regiment was deployed to Kosovo at the corps of TF-MN north from October 2002 to January 2003 and formed first the BIMOTO 9 prior to constituting the BatFra 1 within the cadres of forces restructuration and the BiMéca.
 2003 : following the launching of a Guepard alert, the regiment was projected to Bunia in the Democratic Republic of Congo from June to September 2003 with the cadre of Operation Artemis under the guidance of the EU. The deployment was reinforced by a M120 battery of the 11th Marine Artillery Regiment 11e RAMa, a squadron of the 1st Parachute Hussard Regiment 1er RHP and an engineer combat company of the 6th Engineer Regiment 6e RG. 
 2009 : the 3e RIMa integrated the corps of the GTI Kapisa since June 15, 2009, for six months. Until September 5, 2009, the GTIA led four main combat operations. Missions endured the loss of 5 and nine wounded. 
 The 3rd Marine has also deployed to Soudan, Rwanda, Republic of Central Africa and Albania...

Missions 

Regularly projected in outre-mer missions (notably Guyana) and Africa (Chad, Gabon, Central) as all units that used to be referred as the "Colonial", the 3e RIMa distinguished capability within Division Daguet during the first Gulf War and the former Yugoslavia, particularly in Sarajevo at the capture of the Vrbanja bridge in May 1995.

Since 2002, personnel of the regiment are deployed six months per year:

 2002: NATO Kosovo Operation Trident – Bimoto then BATFRA 1
 2003: Senegal, Côte d'Ivoire
 2003: Democratic Rep. of Congo Ituri Bunia – En Ops Fr MAMBA + EU ARTEMIS
 2004: Afghanistan, New Caledonia
 2004–2005: Côte d'Ivoire
 2005: Kosovo, RCA
 2006–2007: Côte d'Ivoire
 2008: Kosovo, RCA
 2009: Afghanistan (Task Force Korrigan)
 2012–2013: Mali

Organisation 

The regiment is articulated into 8 companies with approximately 1300 men and women:

 Compagnie de Commandement et de Logistique (CCL) – Command and Logistics Company 
 1re Compagnie de Combat (1re Cie) – 1st Combat Company 
 2e Compagnie de Combat (2e Cie) – 2nd Combat Company 
 3e Compagnie de Combat (3e Cie) – 3rd Combat Company 
 4e Compagnie de Combat (4e Cie) – 4th Combat Company 
 5e Compagnie de Combat (5e Cie) – 5th Combat Company
 Compagnie Antichar (CAC) longue portée – Long Range Anti-Tank Company (dormant since 2008)
 Compagnie d'Eclairage et d'Appui (CEA) – Reconnaissance and Support Company
 6e Compagnie de reserve (6e Cie) – 6th Reserve Company

Traditions 

The anniversary is celebrated for combats in Bazeilles, the village which was apprehended and abandoned four consecutive times under orders, respectively on August 31 and September 1, 1870.

Et au Nom de Dieu, vive la coloniale ! 
 In the Name of God, vive la coloniale !

The Marsouins and the Bigors have for Saint, God. This war calling concludes intimate ceremonies which part life in the regiments. Often also at origin as an act of grace to Charles de Foucauld.

Motto 

"Debout les Morts". This sentence, which became the motto of the regiment is credited to Adjudant Péricard (3e RIC) who voiced on February 27, 1915, to stimulate the troops, during the reapprehension of a fort. For this battle, the regiment endured the for the 1st and 2nd battalions of the 3e RIC: 189 killed, 575 wounded and 250 missing.

Insignia of the 3e RIMa 

A Marine anchor with inscription "Bazeilles", a French Imperial Eagle, and the number 3. In 1975, during a regimental inspection, colonel Jean Joubert, regimental commander of the 3rd Marine Infantry Regiment noticed a sketch drawing realized by sergent-chef De Muynck of the 3rd section, 3rd company; accordingly the new insignia of the 3e RIMa was created.

Regimental Colors

Decorations 

The regimental colors of the 3rd Marine Infantry Regiment 3e RIMa is decorated with:

 Croix de guerre 1914–1918 with:
 1 palm & 1 star 
 Croix de guerre 1939–1945 with:
 1 palm
 croix de la Valeur militaire with:
 1 palm 
 Commemorative Medal with:
 clasp "Serbia"
The 3e RIMa was cited at the orders of the armed forces in 1978 and in 1991. 
The regiment was awarded on October 16, 2014 the Fourragere with colors of the Croix de guerre 1914–1918.

Honours

Battle Honours 
 Magador 1844
 Alma 1854
 Palikao 1860
 Ki-Hoa 1861
 Bazeilles 1870
 Sontay 1883
 La Marne 1914
 Champagne 1915
 Dobropolje 1918
 Koweït 1990–1991

Regimental Commanders

3e RIC 

 1914: Colonel Lamolle
 September 5, 1914: Lieutenant-Colonel Condamy
 November 1, 1914 – December 6, 1914: Colonel Claudel

3e RIMa

Notable officers and marines 
 Joseph Gallieni

References

Sources and bibliography 

 
 Erwan Bergot, La coloniale du Rif au Tchad 1925–1980, imprimé en France : décembre 1982, n° d'éditeur 7576, n° d'imprimeur 31129, sur les presses de l'imprimerie Hérissey.

Marines regiments of France
Infantry regiments of France
Military units and formations established in 1838
Recipients of the Croix de Guerre 1914–1918 (France)
Recipients of the Croix de Guerre 1939–1945 (France)
Military units and formations of the Bosnian War
1838 establishments in France